Zhang Ruifang  (15 June 1918 – 28 June 2012) was a Chinese film and theatre actress.

Life
Zhang was born on 15 June 1918 in Baoding in Hebei Province. She studied painting in the Western style at Beiping's National Arts School. She completed the course in 1935. After joining the Communist Party in 1937 she joined the Chinese Drama Society and after she completed her course in 1936 she was employed on the stage. During the war with Japan she performed to support the national effort to resist the Japanese invasion. During the war she took the lead in her first film. The director Sun Yu cast her as a double agent in the film Baptism of Fire. By 1943 she was married for the second time to Jin Shan who served as a spy for the communist party. Her next role was not until after the war in 1946 when her performance in On Songhua River was well received. Zhang modelled her acting persona on her role model Ingrid Bergman.

In 1963, Zhang won Hundred Flowers Award for Best Actress for her household character in comedy Li Shuangshuang. She is considered to be of the "four great drama actresses" in China, along with Bai Yang, Shu Xiuwen and Qin Yi. Zhangs portrayal and the film were praised by the premier Zhou Enlai. Zhang played a character who took an equal role to the men in the story. She completed ten more films before she retired from acting in 1982. After she retired she took an interest in politics. She served on the National Committees of the Chinese People's Political Consultative Conference three times. She was also on national committees for women and another for art and literature.

During the Cultural Revolution, Zhang was imprisoned for a year but she suffered less than some of her contemporaries as some spent six years in captivity.

Later years and death
Zhang rejected capitalism when she started a retirement home in 2000 in Changning in Shanghai. She explained that her purpose was to create a community for 40 people and not to make a profit.

In 2007, she was again honoured at the Golden Rooster Awards when she was given a lifetime achievement award by the China Film Associaction. Zhang died in Shanghai in 2012.

Filmography

References

External links

1918 births
2012 deaths
Actresses from Baoding
Chinese film actresses
20th-century Chinese actresses
Victims of the Cultural Revolution
Chinese stage actresses
People of the Republic of China